Caryocolum baischi is a moth of the family Gelechiidae. It is found in Greece.

Etymology
The species is named in honour of Günter Baisch, who collected the first specimens of this species.

References

Moths described in 2010
baischi
Moths of Europe